Obie Etie Ikechukwu (born 19 January 1987) is a Nigerian footballer who plays as a midfielder. Etie will play in 2015 season for Assyriska United IK in Swedish division 4.

References

External links

1987 births
Living people
Association football midfielders
AFC Eskilstuna players
Östers IF players
Syrianska FC players
Allsvenskan players
Superettan players
Nigerian footballers
Syrianska IF Kerburan players
Sportspeople from Osogbo